The Communists Party (PdelosC) is a communist party in Mexico. Officially created in 2003 when the Mexican Communists'  Party and the Socialist Revolution Party (PRS) merged. Not to be confused with the historical and now-defunct Mexican Communist Party (PCM) and other present communist organisations.

As one of its major characteristics, the party proposes the unification of all the organisations within the “Abajo y a la izquierda” (“Downward Left”) political spectrum. In September 2003 the party became a signatory to the 1992 Pyongyang Declaration in solidarity with the Workers' Party of Korea and the government of North Korea. During the second National Congress of 2006, the party's Central Committee agreed to support and endorse the Sixth Declaration of the Lacandon Jungle as a formal adherent. It has been a strong ally of the Miners' movement in Pasta de Conchos, different struggles of indigenous peoples across the Mexican republic's territory and anticapitalist environmental efforts.

In present, the Communists' Party refuses to register in the National Electoral Institute, since the party's thesis deny any possibility of a deep anticapitalist transformation through the current official institutions.

Secretaries General of the Communists' Party
2003-2006 Sergio Almaguer Cosío
Currently, since 2017 Luis Alfonso Vargas Silva

References

External links
Official Site

Communist parties in Mexico
Far-left politics in Mexico
Political parties in Mexico
Political parties with year of establishment missing